Brytavious Lakeith Chambers (born September 20, 1996), known professionally as Tay Keith, is an American record producer and songwriter. He is best known for co-producing Travis Scott's 2018 single "Sicko Mode", peaking at number one on the Billboard Hot 100, BlocBoy JB's "Look Alive", peaking at number 5 on the Hot 100, and Drake's "Nonstop", peaking at number two. He is signed to publishing deal with Warner Chappell Music and is a BMI member.

On December 15, 2018, Tay Keith earned his bachelor's degree from Middle Tennessee State University (MTSU) in Murfreesboro, Tennessee.

He was nominated for Best Rap Song for his work on "Sicko Mode" at the 61st Annual Grammy Awards.

Early life 
Brytavious Lakeith Chambers was born on September 20, 1996, in South Memphis, Tennessee, where he was also raised. He grew up with his mom and dad knowing that music was going to be his strong point. Keith is the youngest family member out of his two brothers and two sisters.

When he was around fourteen, he began to make music and publish it to YouTube and DatPiff. He also had a piano which he used to make songs and remake popular songs. One of the songs he managed to remake was Lil Wayne's "Lollipop".

Keith met fellow American rapper BlocBoy JB when he was fourteen, after he moved to Raleigh in North Memphis. The two began making music together shortly afterward.

Career 
In 2015, Keith began working with rapper Blac Youngsta on his mixtape, Fuck Everybody, for which he produced the single "Lil Bitch".

Keith gained mainstream success in 2018 through producing BlocBoy JB's "Rover" (later remixed to "Rover 2.0" featuring 21 Savage), "Shoot" and "Look Alive" featuring Drake, Drake's "Nonstop", Travis Scott's "Sicko Mode", Eminem's "Not Alike" featuring Royce da 5'9, and Lil Baby and Gunna's "Never Recover" featuring Drake.

On April 17, 2019, Beyoncé released her album Homecoming: The Live Album, which is the live recording from her Coachella performance. It also included a bonus track "Before I Let Go", produced by Keith.

On March 5, 2020, Aitch released "Rain", a single featuring AJ Tracey; the song was produced by Keith.

Business ventures

McDonald's 
In February 2021, Keith partnered with American fast food restaurant chain McDonald's to promote its new menu item, the Crispy Chicken sandwich. Included with the sandwich was a phonograph record of an unreleased track produced by Keith and a hoodie.

Personal life 
In December 2018, Keith graduated from Middle Tennessee State University, receiving a degree in media management.

In January 2019, Keith was involved in a car crash. He was uninjured after the incident.

Discography 

 Fxck the Cash Up (2020)

Production discography

Charted singles

Other charted songs

Production credits

2013 
Lil B – 100% Gutta

 14. "Still Flexin Membership"

2014 
PnB Rock – Real N*gga Bangaz

 07. "Stylish"

Damso –  Publie Partage Promo 
 01. "Publie Partage Promo"

2015 
T-Wayne – Who Is Rickey Wayne?

 09. "Stallion"

2016 
Blac Youngsta – Young & Reckless

 06. "Catch a Body"
 11. "All Of My N*ggas"

BlocBoy JB – Who Am I

 11. "Change On Your N*ggas"
 16: "No Chorus, Pt. 5"
 19. "No Chorus, Pt. 6"

Blac Youngsta – Fuck Everybody

 01. "Fuck Everybody Intro"
 08. "Lil Bitch"
 10. "On Me"

BlocBoy JB – No Chorus, Pt. 7

 13. "No Chorus, Pt. 7"

Moneybagg Yo & Yo Gotti – 2 Federal

 03. "Afta While"
 10. "Gang Gang" ft. Blac Youngsta
 15. "No Dealings"

Project Pat – Street God 4

 04. "Real Hood N*ggas"
 05. "Catch You Slippin"

BlocBoy JB – Who Am I 2

 02. "Ride To West Memphis"
 09. "Fr"
 12. "No Chorus, Pt. 9"

2017 
Moneybagg Yo – Heartless

 04. "More"
 08. "Hurtin"

Blac Youngsta – Illuminati

 08. "Set Trip"

BlocBoy JB – Loco

 01. "Intro"
 04. "Fucc A N*gga Bitch"
 09. "No Chorus, Pt. 9"
 13. "Outro"

Blac Youngsta – I'm Innocent

 02. "Birthday"

BlocBoy JB – Who Am I 3

 01. "Intro"
 02. "Shoot"
 04. "First Day Bacc on Da Bloc"
 10. "No Chorus, Pt. 10"

Moneybagg Yo – Federal 3X

 02. "Important"
 04. "Doin' It"

BlocBoy JB – The Purple M&M

 01. "Intro"
 02. "BBQ"
 04. "No Topic"
 05. "Pull Up"
 08. "Soulja"
 12. "Outro"

Doe Boy – In Freebandz We Trust 2

 05. "Shoot Em Up"

Starlito – Funerals & Court Dates 2

 09. "Important Freestyle"

Starlito – Starlito's Way 4: GhettOut

 02. "SB4Life"
 04. "SW4"
 09. "Airplane Mode"

2018 
Juicy J – Shutdafukup

 07. "Broke N*ggaz" ft. YKOM

Key Glock – Glock Bond

 09. "Russian Cream"

Moneybagg Yo – 2 Heartless

 06. "Ion Get You"
 09. "Super Fake"
 16. "Back Then"

Xavier Wulf – East Memphis Maniac

 02. "Homecoming (feat. Bankroll Rico)"
 03. "Eastside Sliding (feat. idontknowjeffery & Chris Travis)
 04. "Request Refused"

Blac Youngsta – 223

 06. "Fuck Everybody Else"

BlocBoy JB – Simi

 01. "Turnt Up"
 02. "Look Alive" ft. Drake
 03. "Nun of Dat" ft. Lil Pump
 07. "Rover 2.0" ft. 21 Savage
 09. "Wait"
 10. "Nike Swoosh" ft. YG
 15. "No Chorus, Pt. 11"
 18. "Outro"

Lil Baby – Harder Than Ever

 04. "Exotic" ft. Starlito

Rico Nasty – Nasty

 04. "In The Air" ft. BlocBoy JB
 11. "Transformer" ft. Gnar

Drake – Scorpion

 02. "Nonstop"

Wiz Khalifa – Rolling Papers 2

 10. "Real Rich" ft. Gucci Mane

Moneybagg Yo – Bet On Me

 01. "Dice Game"
 02. "Rush Hour"
 03. "Wat U On" ft. Gunna
 04. "Exactly"
 07. "Correct Me"

Travis Scott – Astroworld

 03. "Sicko Mode" ft. Drake

Blac Youngsta – Fuck Everybody 2

 02. "Uh Uh"
 05. "Ight" ft. Lil Pump

Eminem – Kamikaze

 08. "Not Alike" ft. Royce da 5'9"

Lil Baby and Gunna – Drip Harder

 13. "Never Recover" ft. Drake

Quavo – Quavo Huncho

 06. "Shine"

Lil Yachty – Nuthin' 2 Prove

 08. "Who Want the Smoke?" ft. Cardi B and Offset

BlocBoy JB – Don't Think That

 02. "Club Roc"
 05. "Bacc Street Boys"

Metro Boomin – Not All Heroes Wear Capes

 03. "Don't Come Out The House" ft. 21 Savage

Moneybagg Yo – Reset

 03. "They Madd"

Tee Grizzley – Still My Moment

 02. "Hooters"

Key Glock – Glockoma

 01. "Since 6ix"
 02. "Life Is Great"
 05. "Dope"
 08. "Yea!!"

6ix9ine – Dummy Boy

 01. "Stoopid" ft. Bobby Shmurda

Meek Mill – Championships

 11. "Tic Tac Toe" ft. Kodak Black

2019 
Future – The Wizrd

 02. "Jumpin on a Jet"
 04. "Temptation"
 09. "Promise U That"

Nav – Bad Habits

 17. "Amazing" ft. Future

Beyoncé – Homecoming: The Live Album

 39. "Before I Let Go"

DJ Khaled – Father of Asahd

 02. "Wish Wish" ft. Cardi B and 21 Savage
 03. "Jealous" ft. Chris Brown, Lil Wayne, and Big Sean

Moneybagg Yo – 43va Heartless

 09. "No Filter"

Denzel Curry – Zuu

 04. "Automatic"

Miley Cyrus – She is Coming

 01. "Mother's Daughter"

BlocBoy JB – I Am Me

 04. "Head In My Lap"

Gucci Mane – Delusions of Granduer

 07. "Bottom"
 16. "Look At Me Now"

ILoveMakonnen – M3

 05. "Money Fiend"

Jaden – Erys

 08. "Got It"

Ugly God – Bumps & Bruises

 10. "Batman"

Gucci Mane – Woptober II

 05. "Came from Scratch" ft. Quavo

Hoodrich Pablo Juan – Dope Money Violence

 11. "Pirate"

Flipp Dinero – Love for Guala

 05. "If I Tell You"
 08. "Not Too Many"

Troyman – Rhythm + Flow Soundtrack: The Final Episode

 01. "Streetlight"

2020 
Moneybagg Yo – Time Served

 02. "U Played" featuring Lil Baby

Yo Gotti – Untrapped

 12. "Bounce That"

Marlo – 1st & 3rd

 06. "Stay Down" featuring Young Thug

Lil Baby – My Turn

 07. "Same Thing"
 09. "Commercial" featuring Lil Uzi Vert
 12. "No Sucker" with Moneybagg Yo

Ambjaay – It Cost to Live Like This, Pt. 2

 02. "Blow The Pickle" featuring Wiz Khalifa

Jackboy – Jackboy

 08. "Like a Million" featuring Kodak Black

Nav – Brown Boy 2

 01. "I'm Up"

Polo G – The Goat

 05. "Go Stupid" with Stunna 4 Vegas and NLE Choppa

Future – High Off Life

 20. "100 Shooters" with Doe Boy featuring Meek Mill

Gunna – Wunna

 04. "Feigning"

2021 
Pooh Shiesty – Shiesty Season

 16. "Master P"

G Herbo

 "Really Like That"
Hoodrich Pablo Juan – Designer Dope Boyz

 11. "Easter Egg Hunt"
 13. "Go Get the Bag" with Banbwoi

Key Glock – Yellow Tape 2

 1. "Something Bout Me"
 7. "Ambition For Cash"
Nardo Wick – Who is Nardo Wick?

 7. "Lullaby"

2022 
Pooh Shiesty – Shiesty Season: Certified
 07. "It's Up"

NAV
 Single ft. Travis Scott and Lil Baby

Cardi B
 Hot Shit ft. Kanye West and Lil Durk

DJ Khaled
 LET’S PRAY ft. Don Toliver and Travis Scott

tha Supreme
 c!ao ft. Rondodasosa
 Troyman- What’s Not To Love?

Notes

References 

Living people
Musicians from Memphis, Tennessee
21st-century American musicians
Record producers from Tennessee
1996 births
African-American record producers
Middle Tennessee State University alumni
Trap musicians
21st-century African-American musicians
American hip hop record producers
Southern hip hop musicians